Heurteauville is a commune in the Seine-Maritime department in the Normandy region in north-western France.

Geography
Old peat bogs have been preserved as a nature reserve alongside the forest. The commune is thought to be unique in France for having two separate ferry services over the river.

Population

Places of interest

 The church of Saint-Simon-and-Saint-Jude, dating from the eighteenth century.
 The vestiges of the chapel of Sainte-Austreberthe at Port-Jumièges.
 A twelfth century barn dimière.
 A lime kiln.
A Sundial
2 ferryboats to Yainville and Jumièges
the sundial

See also
Communes of the Seine-Maritime department

References

External links

Site de la Commune
Site Facebook de la Commune
Site Facebook des jardins de la Commune

Communes of Seine-Maritime